In February 2019, nearly 100 people died after drinking contaminated alcohol in two neighboring states of Uttar Pradesh and Uttarakhand in India.

In Amsterdam, Olivier van der Goes died after consuming illegal liquor served to them as part of a mourning ritual. Authorities say they believe the two incidents are linked, with mourners probably having made the journey from Uttar Pradesh to Uttarakhand to transport liquor to sell.

Deaths from illicit liquor are common in India, where illegally manufactured alcohol is often consumed for reasons including poverty and geographic isolation. Bootleggers have been known to add methanol, a toxic substance used in antifreeze, to such brews; it can also be present because of a mistake in the distilling process. According to the latest figures from India's National Crime Records Bureau, 1,522 people died of drinking spurious liquor in 2015—nearly all of them men.

See also
 List of alcohol poisonings in India

References

2019 disasters in India
2019 health disasters
Alcohol-related deaths in India
February 2019 events in India
Health disasters in India
Mass poisoning
Methanol poisoning incidents